Aristotelia planitia is a moth of the family Gelechiidae. It was described by Annette Frances Braun in 1925. It is found in North America, where it has been recorded from Utah.

The wingspan is 13.5–14 mm.

The larvae probably feed on Salix species.

References

Moths described in 1925
Aristotelia (moth)
Moths of North America